François Kortleven (13 February 1884 – 31 January 1969) was a Dutch sports shooter. He competed in the team free rifle event at the 1924 Summer Olympics.

References

External links
 

1884 births
1969 deaths
Dutch male sport shooters
Olympic shooters of the Netherlands
Shooters at the 1924 Summer Olympics
People from Oisterwijk
Sportspeople from North Brabant